Çalış is a town in the District of Haymana, Ankara Province, Turkey.

References

Populated places in Ankara Province
Haymana, Ankara
Towns in Turkey